Chapin's free-tailed bat (Chaerephon chapini) is a species of bat in the family Molossidae. It is found in central and southern Africa.

Description
The body has pale cinnamon-brown or greyish fur that fades to near-white towards the middle of the belly. The wings are white or pale brown in colour. A distinctive crest of hair rises from a small lappet between the ears. The crest is especially well developed in breeding males, and helps to disperse scent from a gland at its base.

Biology and habitat
Chapin's free-tailed bat is found across much of central and southern Africa, between Ethiopia and South Sudan in the northeast, the Republic of the Congo in the northwest, and northern Namibia, Botswana, and Zimbabwe in the south. An isolated population is also known from Ghana and the Ivory Coast. Within this region it inhabits savannah habitats, river valleys and woodland.

The bat is insectivorous, feeding in flight. Its echolocation calls last five to ten milliseconds, and sweep from 27 down to 19 kHz.

Sources

Chaerephon (bat)
Bats of Africa
Mammals described in 1917
Taxonomy articles created by Polbot
Taxa named by Joel Asaph Allen